Caparrós may refer to:

 Joaquín Caparrós, Spanish football coach
 Martín Caparrós, Argentine writer
 Pedro Caparros López Spanish musician